The Marilyn Monroe mural, located at 2602 Connecticut Ave NW, Washington D.C, depicts pop culture icon Marilyn Monroe on the upper outside wall of Salon Roi. It was installed in 1981 by artist John Bailey. It was commissioned by Charles Stinson for Salon Roi's owner, Roi Barnard's 40th birthday.

In 2001, the Woodley Park Neighborhood Association donated funds and brought Bailey back to restore the mural to its original vibrancy, as it had faded greatly. New lights, donated by Starwood Urban, were installed to illuminate the mural at night. The Chipotle Mexican Grill on the corner of Connecticut Ave. and Calvert St., located below the mural, pays for the ongoing electrical costs for the lighting.

The mural has gained widespread fame as a Washington D.C landmark. It is a stop on the Old Towne Trolley tourist bus, and is consistently reproduced in paintings, T-shirts, calendars and postcards. It was voted as the first runner-up in the Washington City Paper's Reader's Poll: Best Mural of D.C 2014.

References 

Murals in Washington, D.C.
Articles containing video clips
Marilyn Monroe
1981 establishments in Washington, D.C.
1981 in art